Ohepalu Nature Reserve is a nature reserve which is located in Lääne-Viru County, Estonia.

The area of the nature reserve is 5935 ha.

The protected area was founded in 1973 on the basis of the southern part of Lahemaa National Park and on the basis of orchids' conservation area in Tapa (founded in 1993).

References

Nature reserves in Estonia
Geography of Lääne-Viru County